Porcellionides myrmicidarum is a species of woodlouse in the Porcellionidae family that is endemic to Sicily.

References

Porcellionidae
Crustaceans described in 1918
Endemic arthropods of Sicily
Woodlice of Europe